Jonathan C. Rougier is professor of statistical science at the University of Bristol. Rougier is a specialist in the assessment of the risk from natural hazards.

He was an undergraduate at University College, Durham. He completed a doctorate at Durham University in 1996, the thesis being titled Price change and volume in a speculative market.

Selected publications
J.C. Rougier, R.S.J. Sparks, and L.J. Hill (eds). Risk and Uncertainty Assessment for Natural Hazards. Cambridge University Press, Cambridge, 2013.

References

External links

Living people
Year of birth missing (living people)
Academics of the University of Bristol
Academics of Durham University
British statisticians
Alumni of University College, Durham